Teretia acus is a species of sea snail, a marine gastropod mollusk in the family Raphitomidae.

Description
The length of the shell attains 4.75 mm, its diameter 2 mm.

Distribution
This marine species occurs off Cape Recife, South Africa

References

 Kilburn R.N. (1986). Turridae (Mollusca: Gastropoda) of southern Africa and Mozambique. Part 3. Subfamily Borsoniinae. Annals of the Natal Museum. 27: 633-720.
 Giles, E. & Gosliner, T. (1983) Primary type specimens of marine Mollusca (excluding Cephalopoda) in the South African Museum. Annals of the South African Museum, 92, 1–52.

External links
 
  Barnard K.H. (1958), Contribution to the knowledge of South African marine Mollusca. Part 1. Gastropoda; Prosobranchiata: Toxoglossa; Annals of the South African Museum. Annale van die Suid-Afrikaanse Museum; vol. 44 (1958)

Endemic fauna of South Africa
acus
Gastropods described in 1958